Pe is the seventeenth letter of the Semitic abjads, including Phoenician Pē , Hebrew Pē , Aramaic Pē , Syriac Pē  ܦ, and Arabic   (in abjadi order).

The original sound value is a voiceless bilabial plosive: ; it retains this value in most Semitic languages, except for Arabic, where the sound  changed into the voiceless labiodental fricative , carrying with it the pronunciation of the letter.
Not to be confused with the Turned g.
The Phoenician letter gave rise to the Greek Pi (Π), Latin P, and Cyrillic П.

Origins	
Pe is usually assumed to come from a pictogram of a “mouth” (in Hebrew pe; in Arabic, فا fah).

Hebrew Pe
It is also romanized pei or pey, especially when used in Yiddish.

Variations on written form/pronunciation 

The letter Pe is one of the six letters which can receive a Dagesh Kal. The six are Bet, Gimel, Daleth, Kaph, Pe, and Tav.

Variant forms of Pe/Fe

A notable variation on the letter Pe is the Pe Kefulah (Doubled Pe), also known as the Pei Lefufah (Wrapped Pe). The Pe Kefulah is written as a small Pe scribed within a larger Pe. This atypical letter appears in Torah scrolls (most often Yemenite Torahs but is also present in Sephardic and Ashkenazi Torahs), manuscripts, and some modern printed Hebrew Bibles. When the Pe is written in the form of a Doubled Pe, this adds a layer of deeper meaning to the Biblical text. This letter variation can appear on the final and non-final forms of the Pe.

There are two orthographic variants of this letter which indicate a different pronunciation:

Pe with the dagesh
When the Pe has a "dot" in its center, known as a dagesh, it represents a voiceless bilabial plosive, . There are various rules in Hebrew grammar that stipulate when and why a dagesh is used.

Fe
When Pe appears without the dagesh dot in its center, then it usually represents a voiceless labiodental fricative .

Final form of Pe/Fe
At the end of words, the letter's written form changes to a Pe/Fe Sophit (Final Pe/Fe): .

"Philip"), while borrowings ending in  still use the Pe Sofit (e.g. "fun", from Arabic).

Significance 
In gematria, Pe represents the number 80. Its final form represents 800 but this is rarely used, Tav written twice (400+400) being used instead.

Arabic  
The letter  is named  . It is written in several ways depending on its position in the word:

Examples on usage in Modern Standard Arabic:
  is a multi-function prefix most commonly equivalent to "so" or "so that." For example:   ("we write") →   ("so we write").

Maghrebi variant 
In Maghrebi scripts, the i'ajami dot in  has traditionally been written underneath. Once the prevalent style, it is now mostly used in countries of the Maghreb in ceremonial situations or for writing Qur'an, with the exception of Libya and Algeria, which adopted the Mashriqi form (dot above).

Central Asian variant

Theoretically this shape could be approximated by using , but in practice  is used in databases of these languages, and most commercial fonts for these languages give the codepoint of the usual Arabic  a shape like .

The Uyghur keyboard layout in Windows 7 and Windows Server 2008 R2 changed that key combination to give . On the newer systems, the old keyboard layout is still available under the name Uyghur (Legacy).

Diacriticized Arabic versions 
It may be used interchangeably with the modified letter  -  (with 3 dots above) in this case.

The character is mapped in Unicode under position U+06A4.

Maghrebi variant 
The Maghrebi style, used in Northwestern Africa, the dots moved underneath (Unicode U+06A5), because it is based on the other style of :

Other similar letters

Character encodings

References

External links

Phoenician alphabet
Faʼ
Hebrew letters
Letters with final form